Rédouane Asloum (born 1 July 1981) is a French boxer. He competed in the men's light flyweight event at the 2004 Summer Olympics.

References

External links
 

1981 births
Living people
French male boxers
Olympic boxers of France
Boxers at the 2004 Summer Olympics
Light-flyweight boxers